Artyom Igorevich Varakin (born 21 April 1987) is a Russian former footballer.

External links
  Player page on the official FC Moscow website
 

1987 births
Sportspeople from Volgograd
Living people
Russian footballers
Association football midfielders
FC Moscow players
Russian Premier League players
FC Volgar Astrakhan players